Melissa & Doug, LLC (formerly Lights, Camera, Interaction!, Inc) is an American manufacturer of children's toys, including wooden puzzles, arts & crafts products, plush toys, and other educational toys. The company was founded in 1988 by Melissa and Doug Bernstein in their basement and in Doug's parents' garage. All products are designed at its Wilton, Connecticut headquarters.

The company has factories in the U.S. and abroad with about 1,000 employees worldwide, including some in China and India. A 2013 New York Times profile reported that it had achieved double-digit growth every year.

History
The private company was founded in 1988 when the co-founders left corporate careers to start their own company. Three of their four parents were educators, so they were drawn to doing something involving children.

Later on, Melissa and Doug Bernstein made three short films for home video under the "Lights, Camera, Interaction!" banner and under the name "Special Friends", all of these films starring 8-year-old Brett Ambler: "You On Kazoo!" (1989), which promoted a Kazoo toy; "Let's Sing-Along" (1990), which promoted a microphone toy; and "Ring-Along, Sing-Along" (1991), promoting a bell-ringing toy. The videotapes were marketed directly to small, independent toy stores, but did not sell well.
However, these three short films would become famous in the mid-2010s, when "You on Kazoo!" was uploaded to YouTube, and became a viral meme, thanks to the kazoo scenes, and "The Kazoo Kid" would later become the official nickname for Ambler. The video was remixed by Mike Diva in February 2016, and sampled by Florian Rehn Olsson in his SoundCloud song "dootdoot".

The first product that brought them attention was the Fuzzy Farm Puzzle, a wooden puzzle with texture. An extensive line of wooden puzzles followed. In the late 1990s, the company expanded into wooden toys, arts & crafts, pretend play, plush toys, and more.

In 2010, private equity firm Berkshire Partners became an owner of Melissa & Doug.

The company was fined $1,386 on November 15, 2012, by the U.S. Immigration and Customs Enforcement for hiring unlawful employees.

In 2016, Melissa Bernstein told Good Morning America that she thinks that imaginary play helps children explore, create, take risks and discover who they really are. The show reported that the company has made more than 5,000 products, putting them "in the same league as toy titans Mattel and LEGO."

In 2017, Melissa & Doug was acquired by AEA Investors.

The Melissa & Doug philosophy of having all screen-free toys matches the American Academy of Pediatrics' recommendation that parents limit screen time for young children.

The company sponsors an entrepreneurship program at Duke University, Melissa's alma mater, providing funding and mentors throughout the year. Melissa and Doug Bernstein help students in the program. Melissa and Doug have also endowed a leadership program for students at the University of Connecticut, Doug's alma mater, where he had been very involved in student activities as an undergraduate.

References

External links
 MelissaAndDoug.com
 How I Built This - Melissa & Doug: Melissa And Doug Bernstein

Toy companies of the United States
1988 establishments in Connecticut
Companies based in Fairfield County, Connecticut
Wilton, Connecticut
American companies established in 1988
Toy companies established in 1988